Thomas Odoard Marshall Lodge (16 April 1936 – 25 March 2012) was an English author and radio broadcaster.

Early life
Lodge was a figure in British radio of the 1960s. He was a disc jockey on Radio Caroline. He was the son of the writer Oliver W F Lodge and his wife Diana, and a grandson of the physicist Sir Oliver Lodge. He was born on 16 April 1936, in Tanleather Cottage, Forest Green, Surrey.
When World War II broke out, his family left England. He was brought up in Maryland and Virginia. At the end of the war he returned with his family to England and lived near Painswick, Gloucestershire. He was educated at Bedales School, England, where he developed his interest in music. He took lessons on the violin and the clarinet, taught himself the guitar and mouth organ, and played the stand up bass in a four piece skiffle band, called the "Top Flat Ramblers". 

When Lodge was eighteen, he travelled to Hay River, Northwest Territories and worked in commercial fishing on the Great Slave Lake. While fishing with a colleague, he was blown out into open waters on an ice floe. His companion died, but Lodge was rescued by some trappers. He described his adventures in his first book, Beyond the Great Slave Lake (published by Cassells in 1957 and E.P. Dutton in 1958). In 1956 he returned to England. He married Jeanine Arpourettes in 1957.  They returned to Hay River, Canada, where he ran a fishing business.   They had three sons: Tom Jr. (b. 1959, Yellowknife, North West Territories, Canada), Brodie (b. 1961, London, England), and Lionel (b. 1962, Inverness, Scotland). All three sons are involved in music, being significantly influenced and educated by Tom Sr., Tom Jr is in his eleventh year of a weekly Sunday (9-11 p.m. U.K. time) music show (originating as 'the two Toms' with Tom Sr.) which Tom Jr uploads from Canada to Radio Caroline in the U.K., www.radiocaroline.co.uk . Radio Caroline turned fifty, March 2014, Tom also has 3 grandchildren, and 3 great-grandchildren.

Broadcasting
In the late 1950s Lodge moved to Yellowknife, where he worked in a goldmine until he joined the Canadian Broadcasting Corporation as an announcer on CFYK. On 27 May 1959, a son, Tom Lodge Jr. was born. Tom Jr. is currently a presenter on Radio Caroline. In 1960 Lodge became the CBC manager for a new radio station CBXH in Fort Smith, N.W.T., until he returned to England as a CBC correspondent. In 1964 Lodge joined England's first offshore pirate radio station Radio Caroline, as disc jockey and programme director. His book The Ship that Rocked the World describes his time there. The motion picture "Pirate Radio" is based on the novel. After the outlawing of the pirate radio ships in 1967 by the Marine Broadcasting Offences Act, he worked as a disc jockey for the BBC's newly created Radio 1.

In 1968 Lodge became a disc jockey on CHLO-AM, St Thomas, Ontario, Canada, where he continued to build his reputation for breaking new music.  In 1973 he founded a creative program at Fanshawe College London, Ontario, Canada, called "Creative Electronics", which after three years he made into Music Industry Arts, a training program for recording engineers and record producers, and is still operating at Fanshawe College. Tom Sr although resigned from radio, continued to contribute to his son Tom Jr's weekly radio Caroline show when he was able, also he did 2 last shows for his beloved Radio Caroline, one being his personal history of Radio Caroline and the music that was integral to it, the other being a close look at the history and importance of the lead guitar, playing the lead guitar solos that changed rock n roll. Both shows are still available in the Caroline web shop.

Umi
In 1975, in California, Lodge began practising Zen. In January 1998 his Master changed his name to Umi and he began guiding people in Zen. He had a zendo, "Stillpoint Zen Community", near Santa Cruz, California.

Bibliography
Beyond the Great Slave Lake, (Cassells, 1958)
Beyond the Great Slave Lake, (E.P. Dutton, 1959)
Success Without Goals, (Lloyds Mayfair Group, 1992)
Circles,Tom Lodge Becoming Umi (Lloyds Mayfair Group, 1993)
Footprints in the Snow, (Umi Foundation, 2000)
The River and the Raven, (Umi Foundation, 2002)
Enlightenment Guaranteed, (Umi Foundation, 2002)
The Radio Caroline Story, (Umi Foundation, 2002)
The Ship That Rocked The World, How Radio Caroline Defied the Establishment, Launched the British Invasion and Made the Planet Safe for Rock and Roll, (Bartleby Press 2010)
God is a Dancer, (Umi Foundation, 2007)
The Diamond Sutra with Umi, (Church of Consciousness, 2008)

References

1936 births
2012 deaths
British radio DJs
English radio personalities
British radio presenters
Offshore radio broadcasters
People educated at Bedales School
People from Gloucester County, Virginia
People from Surrey
Pirate radio personalities
People from Hay River